The 1928 Korvpalli Meistriliiga was the 3rd season of the Estonian basketball league.

A single game was held on 1 April 1928 with Tallinna Vitjas defeating Tallinna NMKÜ 42–22.

References

External links
 Official website 

Korvpalli Meistriliiga seasons
1928 in basketball
1928 in Estonian sport